The term county auditor is applied as a descriptor, and sometimes as a title, for the fiscal officer in county government with oversight responsibility of all financial books and records of all county offices.

United States
The county auditor position is common in every state in the United States. In some states, the position is appointed by county commissioners or district judges. In others, it is an elected position. In Florida, for example, the county auditor is elected to a four-year term.

Texas
In Texas, county government was created in the Constitution of 1836.  The county auditor is appointed by the district judge(s) and prepares and administers accounting records for all county funds.  The county auditor also audits the records and accounts of the various county departments and verifies the validity and legality of all county disbursements.  In counties with more than 225,000 residents, the county auditor serves as budget officer.

References

United States government officials
Counties
Local government